Cascastel-des-Corbières is a commune in the Aude department in southern France.

Its population is 221. Amenities include a post office, a primary school, and a town hall with a municipal government. The locals are known as the Cascastellois.

The surrounding area is host to medieval-era citadels that are open to the public. The beaches of Leucate and the Cathar castles are nearby.

Population

See also
 Fitou AOC
 Corbières AOC
 Communes of the Aude department

References

Communes of Aude
Aude communes articles needing translation from French Wikipedia